East Hall is a historic home located on the campus of West Virginia State University at Institute, Kanawha County, West Virginia.  It was built in 1893, and is a modest, two-story frame building with a hipped roof. In 1937, it was moved from the east side of campus to the west quadrangle.  Until 1974, it was the official home to presidents of West Virginia State University and is the oldest building on campus.

It was listed on the National Register of Historic Places in 1988.

References

African-American history of West Virginia
Houses completed in 1893
Houses in Kanawha County, West Virginia
Houses on the National Register of Historic Places in West Virginia
National Register of Historic Places in Kanawha County, West Virginia
West Virginia State University
University and college buildings on the National Register of Historic Places in West Virginia